Sai Naomi Bennett (born 30 May 1990) is an English actress and model. She began her career in modeling and gained prominence through her roles in the film The Face of an Angel (2014) and the ITV period drama Mr Selfridge (2014–2015). She has since appeared in the Starz series The Spanish Princess (2020).

Early life and education
Bennett was born in Aldershot, Hampshire and grew up in Hackney, East London with her older sister and younger brother. She is of Welsh descent. She attended the now defunct Royal School, Hampstead and left at sixteen after completing her GCSEs. She traveled and worked odd jobs before her former school drama teacher suggested she try acting. She began taking weekend acting classes and signed with an agent. Her brother also took part in local theatre.

Career
Bennett was 13 when she booked her first modeling job for Japanese Vogue. She signed with Storm Models. She featured in Cosmopolitan'''s 2011 Sexy Eyes photoshoot. She also had gigs with Urban Outfitters, Hollister Co., and Daisy London.

In 2012, Bennett made both her film and television debuts in Trapped as Emily and the first series of the BBC One drama Prisoners' Wives as Saskia. In 2014, she joined the cast of ITV period drama Mr Selfridge for its second and third series as the seamstress Jessie Pertree and played Elizabeth Pryce in Michael Winterbottom's psychological thriller The Face of an Angel. This was followed by roles in the 2015 film Just Jim and the 2016 BBC Two 1940s-set miniseries Close to the Enemy.

Bennett starred in the 2018 Syfy television film sequels Lake Placid: Legacy directed by Darrell Roodt and Leprechaun Returns. She appeared in Greta Bellamacina's Hurt by Paradise in 2019. That same year, it was announced Bennett would star as Mary Tudor, later Queen of France, in the latter half of the Starz historical miniseries The Spanish Princess, which aired in 2020. She appeared in the 2022 BBC Three musical drama Mood''.

Personal life
Bennett is engaged to chef and restauranteur Matthew Scott. The couple have a daughter, born February 2022 at Homerton University Hospital.

Filmography

Film

Television

Music videos

References

External links
 
 Sai Bennett at Curtis Brown

Living people
1990 births
Actors from Aldershot
Actresses from Hampshire
Actresses from London
English female models
English people of Welsh descent
Models from London
People educated at The Royal School, Hampstead
People from Hackney, London